Falkenau is a village and a former municipality in the district of Mittelsachsen, in Saxony, Germany. Since 1 October 2011, it is part of the town Flöha.

References 

Former municipalities in Saxony
Flöha